Dennis "Duke" Nalon (March 2, 1913 – February 26, 2001) was an American midget car, sprint car, and Indy 500 driver from Chicago, Illinois, United States.

Racing career
Nalon began as a pit crew member for Wally Zale. Nalon occasionally warmed up the car. When Walter Galven needed a driver, Zale convinced Galven to allow Nalon to race. Nalon won the feature event.

Nalon was nicknamed "The Iron Duke." Nalon was part of the "Chicago Gang" with Tony Bettenhausen. They toured tracks in the Midwest and East Coast of the United States.

Midget cars
Nalon won races on the United States' East Coast in the 1930s.  Nalon competed in midget cars throughout his career. He ran his final career race at the only  midget race ever run at Terre Haute. He raced Johnny Pawl’s famous midget to victory. He ended his career the way he started it: with a win.

Sprint cars
He won the 1938 East Coast AAA Sprint car championship.

Indy cars
Nalon started ten Indianapolis  races, finishing only 3. He started from the pole twice, and was twice the fastest qualifier. In 1947, he competed in a Mercedes-Benz W154.

1949 Indianapolis 500 Crash
In 1949, he was involved in a massive, fiery crash in Turn 3. He backed into the wall and the car burst into flames. He survived only because he held his breath (to prevent asphyxiation), and he jumped out of the car while it was still moving. He had severe burns to his legs which gave him trouble until his death in 2001.

Indianapolis 500 results

Complete Formula One World Championship results
(key) (Races in bold indicate pole position)

World Championship career summary
The Indianapolis 500 was part of the FIA World Championship from 1950 through 1960. Drivers competing at Indy during those years were credited with World Championship points and participation. Duke Nalon participated in 3 World Championship races. He started on the pole once but scored no World Championship points.

Awards
He was inducted in the National Midget Auto Racing Hall of Fame in 1987.
He was named to the National Sprint Car Hall of Fame in 1991.
In 2015, he was inducted in the Motorsports Hall of Fame of America.

References

1913 births
2001 deaths
Indianapolis 500 drivers
Indianapolis 500 polesitters
National Sprint Car Hall of Fame inductees
Racing drivers from Chicago
AAA Championship Car drivers